Kim Hee-Chan (born December 23, 1992) is a South Korean actor.

Filmography

Films

Television series

Variety shows

Radio shows

References

External links 
 
Kim Hee-chan at Instagram

1992 births
Living people
21st-century South Korean male actors
South Korean male film actors
South Korean male television actors